Frank Dalmon Stafford (August 15, 1856 – January 21, 1928) was an American physician and politician who served in the Vermont House of Representatives in the 1880s, and as mayor of North Adams, Massachusetts in the early 1900s.

Early life 
Stafford was born to Joel C. and Jane A. (Stroud) Stafford in Stamford, Vermont on August 15, 1856.  Stafford attended the local public schools. Stafford attended Williamstown High School in Williamstown, Massachusetts, and studied medicine at Burlington Medical College.

He represented Windham County in the Vermont legislature in 1888 and 1889, while residing in Whitingham.

Marriage 
Stafford married Flora A. Ballou, the daughter of Hosea B. and Adeline (Murdock) Ballou in Whitingham.

References

1856 births
People from Stamford, Vermont
Mayors of North Adams, Massachusetts
Massachusetts Republicans
Members of the Vermont House of Representatives
University of Vermont alumni
Physicians from Vermont
1928 deaths
Vermont Republicans